Ericomyrtus serpyllifolia is a shrub endemic to Western Australia.

It is found in the Mid West, South West, Great Southern, Wheatbelt and Goldfields-Esperance regions of Western Australia between Geraldton, Albany and Cape Arid National Park.

References

Eudicots of Western Australia
serpyllifolia
Endemic flora of Western Australia
Plants described in 2015
Taxa named by Barbara Lynette Rye